(born 19 October 1956) is a Japanese photographer, and "the leading practitioner if not the founder of the ever-popular 'Ruins' or 'Urban Exploration' genre of photography".

Life and career
Born in Bunkyō-ku, Tokyo, on 19 October 1956, Kobayashi graduated from the Economics department of Senshu University in 1978. After working for studios and publishing, he went freelance in 1984, and set up Studio Rise (Sutajio Raizu) in 1988. He won various photography awards in the 1990s.

Prints from Kobayashi's Deathtopia series are in the permanent collection of the Tokyo Metropolitan Museum of Photography.

Awards

Solo exhibitions
Building the Chanel Lumière Tower. Tokyo Metropolitan Museum of Photography, March–April 2005. About the creation of the Chanel Ginza building.
Umihito 1977–1988 = . Nakata Museum (Onomichi, Hiroshima Prefecture), October–November 2008.
Hachinohe City. Kōdansha K-Square building, near Gokoku-ji, Tokyo, October 2009.
Shimanami Setouchi-kai. Nakata Museum, March–May 2011.
Torigoe now. , July 2019. About .

References

External links

1956 births
Living people
Artists from Tokyo
Japanese photographers
People from Bunkyō